Undheim is a village in Time municipality in Rogaland county, Norway. The village of Mossige lies just to the northwest of Undheim.

The main economic activity in and around Undheim is agriculture.  It is mainly centered around dairy, beef, pork, and sheep, as well as cultivating fungi and potatoes. The Norwegian poet and writer Arne Garborg (1851-1924) was born on a small farm just outside Undheim.  Undheim Church is located in the village.

References

Villages in Rogaland
Time, Norway